The year 1976 in archaeology involved some significant events.

Excavations
The Chaco Project (National Park Service and University of New Mexico) excavates fourteen rooms at Pueblo Alto from 1976 to 1978.
Hwangnyongsa, a large-scale Buddhist temple of the Korean Three Kingdoms state of Silla dating to AD 553 (excavations continue until 1983).
Excavations at Tell Brak, Syria, are begun by a team from the Institute of Archaeology of the University of London (continue until 1981).
Excavations at Tell el-'Oueili in Iraq are begun under the direction of Jean-Louis Huot (continue until 1989).
Excavations in the Karakum Desert by Viktor Sarianidi uncover the Bactria–Margiana Archaeological Complex.
Excavations at Mezhirich, Ukraine, resume, by N. L. Korniets and M. I. Gladkih (continue to 1981).
Neolithic Tomb of the Eagles in Orkney first excavated by Ronald Simison.
 Excavation at Twann Bahnhof neolithic pile dwelling site in Switzerland (begun 1974) concludes.
Chogha Bonut discovered in Iran and excavation begins.
Watch Hill Castle in Greater Manchester, England, partially excavated by the North Cheshire Archaeology Group under the direction of Barry Johnson
Rescue excavation at Updown early medieval cemetery in Kent, England, led by Sonia Chadwick Hawkes uncovered 36 graves.

Publications
The Landscape of Towns by Michael Aston and James Bond.
La Résistance africaine à la Romanisation by Marcel Bénabou.
The Stone Circles of the British Isles by Aubrey Burl.
The Mycenaean World by John Chadwick.
Prehistoric Maori Fortifications by Aileen Fox.
"The integration of historical and archaeological data concerning an historic wreck site, the Kennemerland", by Keith Muckelroy, World Archaeology 7.3 pp 280–289.
Farming in the Iron Age by Peter J Reynolds.
Industrial Archeology: A New Look at the American Heritage by Theodore Anton Sande.

Finds
Tomb of Fu Hao discovered at Yinxu.
Joya de Cerén, "Pompeii of the Americas".
Nim Li Punit.
The fourth trove of Qabala treasures.
Fossil animal footprints found at Laetoli, Tanzania.

Events
 August 8: Founding of the modern Korean Archaeological Society, in Seoul, South Korea.
 August 27: Round Table removed from the wall of Winchester Castle in England for archaeological examination.

Deaths
 July 22: Mortimer Wheeler, British archaeologist (b. 1890)
 November 1: Gustav Riek, German archaeologist (b. 1900)
 December 19: Neil Judd, American archaeologist (b. 1887)

References

Archaeology
Archaeology, 1976 In
Archaeology by year
Archaeology, 1976 In